The Tatanagar–Katihar Express is an Express train belonging to South Eastern Railway zone that runs between  and  in India. It is currently being operated with 28181/28182 train numbers on a tri-weekly basis.

Service

The 28181/Tatanagar–Katihar Express has an average speed of 34 km/hr and covers 591 km in 17h 20m. The 28182/Katihar–Tatanagar Express has an average speed of 39 km/hr and covers 591 km in 15h 20m.

Route and halts 

The important halts of the train are:

 
 
 
 Joychandi Pahar railway station ( alternative)
 
 
 
 
 New Barauni

Coach composition

The train has standard ICF rakes with a max speed of 110 kmph. The train consists of 19 coaches:

 1 AC II Tier
 1 AC III Tier
 7 Sleeper coaches
 8 Second Seating coaches
 2 Seating cum Luggage Rake

Traction

Both trains are hauled by a Tatanagar Loco Shed-based WAP-7 or Asansol Loco Shed-based WAP-4 electric locomotive from Tatanagar to Asansol. From Asansol, trains are hauled by a Asansol Loco Shed-based WAP-4 electric locomotive uptil Katihar and vice versa.

Slip coaches

It used to run linked with Tatanagar-Thawe Express (then running upto Chhapra) upto Barauni and used to get detached there to continue its journey. This system was discontinued during suspension of train services during COVID-19 pandemic in India.

Rake Sharing

It shares its rake with Tatanagar-Thawe Express (formerly Tatanagar-Chhapra Express).

Direction reversal

The train reverses its direction 1 time:

See also 

 Tatanagar Junction railway station
 Katihar Junction railway station
 Utsarg Express
 Tatanagar-Thawe Express

Notes

References

External links 

 28181/Tatanagar–Katihar Express India Rail Info
 28182/Katihar–Tatanagar Express India Rail Info

Transport in Jamshedpur
Transport in Katihar
Express trains in India
Rail transport in West Bengal
Rail transport in Jharkhand
Rail transport in Bihar